New Mexico State Road 7 (NM 7) is a  paved, two-lane state highway in Eddy County in the U.S. state of New Mexico. NM 7 east terminus is in Whites City at the road's junction with U.S. Route 62 and U.S. Route 180 which run concurrently at that location. The road travels mostly west from there in a somewhat winding path leading to Carlsbad Caverns National Park Visitors Center.

Route description
NM 7 starts at the intersection with US 62/US 180 in Whites City right across from Whites City Fire Department. The highway travels north-northwest through Whites City and after  reaches the boundary of the Carlsbad Caverns National Park. From there the road follows the bottom of the Walnut Canyon winding through the northeastern end of the Guadalupe Ridge mountains slowly changing direction from northern to western. Shortly after passing a 5 mile mark, the highway turns sharply south climbing up the ridge, swings east and arrives at the Visitors Center.

History
The original Route 7 traveled between Route 1 in Alameda through San Ysidro and Jemez to Jemez Springs as can be seen on 1918 and 1923 maps. In 1927, a section between San Ysidro and Alameda was reassigned to Route 44. In 1929 the road was redesignated as Route 4.

After the Carlsbad Caverns National Park was established in 1923 a road was built connecting it to Route 18 (modern day US 62 /US 180). This road was designated as NM 7 in June 1929 by the New Mexico State Highway Commission.

On December 9, 1981, New Mexico State Highway Commission approved the following resolution:

Major intersections

See also

References

External links

007
Transportation in Eddy County, New Mexico